Ji-min, also spelled Jee-min, is a Korean unisex given name. Its meaning differs based on the hanja used to write each syllable of the name. There are 46 hanja with the reading "ji" and 27 hanja with the reading "min" on the South Korean government's official list of hanja which may be used in given names. Ji-min was South Korea's third-most popular name for baby girls in 2008, with 2,792 being given the name.

People with this name include:

Actresses
Yoon Ji-min (born Yoon Ji-young, 1977), South Korean actress
Han Ji-min (born 1982), South Korean actress
Kim Ji-min (comedian) (born 1984), South Korean female comedian and actress
Kwak Ji-min (born Kwak Sun-hee, 1985), South Korean actress
Kim Ji-min (actress) (born 2000), South Korean actress

Musicians
 J-Min (born Oh Ji-min, 1988), South Korean female singer
 Shin Ji-min (born 1991), South Korean female rapper, former member of AOA
 Jimin (born Park Ji-min, 1995), South Korean male singer, member of BTS
 Jamie (singer) (born Park Ji-min, 1997), South Korean female singer, former member of 15&

Sportspeople
Kang Ji-min (born 1980), South Korean female golfer
Lee Ji-min (born 1983), South Korean male football full back (K League)
Kim Ji-min (footballer, born 1984), South Korean male football forward (K League)
Ha Jee-min (born 1989), South Korean male sailor
An Ji-min (born 1992), South Korean female speed skater
Kim Ji-min (footballer, born 1993), South Korean male football striker (Korea National League)
Park Ji-min (footballer) (born 2000), South Korean male footballer

See also
List of Korean given names

References

Korean unisex given names